Cristiano Bacci (born 6 July 1975) is an Italian retired footballer and current assistant coach of PAOK. He has played as central defender.

Career a player

During his career he has played for Roma and for various Serie C2 and Serie D teams, such as Viareggio, Olbia, Sanremese, Pro Vercelli, Legnano, Biellese and Virtus Entella.

Career as manager

After his retirement he became the manager of Virtus Entella juniores and he won the Campionato Juniores Nazionali.

He in the season 2010–11 became the coach of the first team in the Lega Pro Seconda Divisione Group A until the 30th game, when after the 2–0 defeat by Pro Patria, was sacked and replaced by Luca Prina.

From 5 December 2011 until the end of the season he was the new coach of Derthona.

References

External links
 

Living people
Association football defenders
1975 births
Italian footballers
A.S. Roma players
A.S.D. Sangiovannese 1927 players
[[Accessoryfor is 
S.S.D. Lucchese 1905 players]]
Olbia Calcio 1905 players
S.S.D. Sanremese Calcio players
F.C. Pro Vercelli 1892 players
A.C. Legnano players
U.S. Città di Pontedera players
S.C. Olhanense managers
Valenzana Mado players
F.C. Esperia Viareggio players
Montevarchi Calcio Aquila 1902 players
Virtus Entella players
PAOK FC non-playing staff
Italian football managers
A.S.D. La Biellese players